4° may refer to:
4°, or Quarto a book or pamphlet produced from full 'blanksheets', each of which is printed with eight pages of text, four to a side
4°, a reference to a 4-degrees Celsius increase in the global average temperature due to climate change, 4 Degrees and Beyond International Climate Conference
"4°", the third single by the progressive rock band Tool from their 1993 album Undertow
"4 Degrees", the first single by experimental pop singer Anohni from her 2016 album Hopelessness

See also
4O (disambiguation)